Jacques Rolland (14 October 1914, Paris – 11 September 1999) was a French politician. He represented the Radical Party in the National Assembly from 1956 to 1958. Rolland was a friend of Emmanuel Levinas, introduced through a mutual acquaintance, the medievalist Bruno Roy; he wrote an introductory essay to the 1982 publication of Levinas's De l'évasion, entitled "Getting Out of Being by a New Path".

References

Bibliography 
 Silvano Petrosino, Jacques Rolland, La vérité nomade. Introduction à Emmanuel Lévinas, La Découverte, 1984

1914 births
1999 deaths
Politicians from Paris
Radical Party (France) politicians
Deputies of the 3rd National Assembly of the French Fourth Republic
French military personnel of World War II